"Let the Music Take Control" is a song by J.M. Silk, that was released as their fifth single, on RCA Records in 1987.

The song written by Steve "Silk" Hurley and Keith Nunnally peaked at number two in the US Dance chart in 1987, reaching its top in UK at number forty-seven.

Credits and personnel
Keith Nunnally - lead vocal, writer
Steve Hurley - writer, producer, mix
Larry Sturm - mix
Phil Balsano - producer

Official versions
"Let The Music Take Control (LP Version)" - 3:55
"Let The Music Take Control (House Mix)" - 6:10
"Let The Music Take Control (Radio Edit)" - 4:02
"Let The Music Take Control (House of Trix Mix)" - 8:30
"Let The Music Take Control (Insaneappella)" - 5:30

Charts and sales

Peak positions

See also
List of artists who reached number one on the US Dance chart

References

External links
 [ Steve "Silk" Hurley] on AllMusic
 [ J.M. Silk] on AllMusic

1987 singles
1986 songs
Steve "Silk" Hurley songs
Songs written by Steve "Silk" Hurley
Songs written by Keith Nunnally
RCA Records singles